Death of Jezebel is a 1948 mystery crime novel by the British author Christianna Brand. It is the fourth entry in the series featuring the fictional police detective Inspector Cockerill, and sees him working alongside Inspector Charlesworth a character from Brand's debut novel Death in High Heels.

Synopsis
Isabel Drew, a beautiful and arrogant actress, has widely been known as Jezebel since she drove her best friend's fiancé to kill himself. While performing in a medieval extravaganza in London she and other cast members receive letters threatening to kill them.

References

Bibliography
 Bargainnier, Earl F. & Dove George N. Cops and Constables: American and British Fictional Policemen. Popular Press, 1986.
 Gaines, Janet Howe . Music in the Old Bones: Jezebel Through the Ages. SIU Press, 1999.
 Reilly, John M. Twentieth Century Crime & Mystery Writers. Springer, 2015.

1948 British novels
Novels by Christianna Brand
British crime novels
Novels set in London
British detective novels
The Bodley Head books